, located in Takatsu-ku, Kawasaki, is a Shinto shrine in Kanagawa prefecture, Japan. It was established in 1641 and was called "Shinmeisha". It was renamed "Futako Shrine" in the Meiji Era, after the area in which it is located.

Features
It is known for the "Kanoko Monument" sculpture next to the shrine. The sculpture was made by the artist Tarō Okamoto, who was born locally. The sculpture is dedicated to the artist's mother, Kanoko Okamoto.

Gallery

See also
 List of Shinto shrines

References

External links
 website

Shinto shrines in Kanagawa Prefecture
1641 establishments in Japan
Religious buildings and structures completed in 1641